Alain Bellouis (born 28 July 1947) is a former French racing cyclist. He finished in last place in the 1972 Tour de France.

References

External links
 

1947 births
Living people
French male cyclists
Sportspeople from Essonne
Cyclists from Île-de-France
20th-century French people